The 2012 Pocono 400 Presented by #NASCAR was a NASCAR Sprint Cup Series stock car race held on June 10, 2012, at Pocono Raceway in Long Pond, Pennsylvania, United States. Contested over 160 laps, it was the fourteenth race of the 2012 NASCAR Sprint Cup Series season. Joey Logano of Joe Gibbs Racing won the race from the pole (the second of his career, and the first to have come in a race that went the scheduled distance) while Mark Martin finished second and Tony Stewart finished third.

There were seven cautions and 21 lead changes among ten different drivers during the race. Logano's win moved him to 15th position in the drivers' championship, 125 points behind leader Matt Kenseth and 18 ahead of Kasey Kahne in 16th. In the Manufacturers' Championship, Chevrolet maintained the first position with 96 points, 13 ahead of Toyota. Ford was placed third with 71 points, 13 ahead of Dodge with 22 races remaining in the season.

Report

Background

Pocono Raceway is one of six  superspeedways to hold NASCAR races, the others being Daytona International Speedway, Michigan International Speedway, Auto Club Speedway, Indianapolis Motor Speedway and Talladega Superspeedway. The track's turns are banked differently; the first is banked at 14°, the second turn at 8° and the final turn with 6°. However, each of the three straightaways are banked at 2°. Jeff Gordon was the defending race winner.

In preparation for the race, NASCAR held three test sessions on June 6–7, 2012 for teams to test the newer pavement at Pocono, as the track had been repaved following the previous year's events. Top speeds at the end of the front straightaway approached , however NASCAR determined that the use of restrictor plates would not be required.

On June 5, 2012, NASCAR suspended Phoenix Racing driver Kurt Busch from the race after verbally abusing a media member and taking actions detrimental to stock car racing one week earlier at Dover International Speedway.

Before the race, Greg Biffle led the Drivers' Championship with 486 points, and Matt Kenseth stood in second with 485. Dale Earnhardt Jr. was third in the Drivers' Championship with 476, twelve points ahead of Denny Hamlin and twenty-three ahead of Jimmie Johnson in fourth and fifth. Martin Truex Jr., with 453, was one point ahead of Kevin Harvick, as Tony Stewart with 407 points, was one ahead of Kyle Busch and two in front of Clint Bowyer. In the Manufacturers' Championship, Chevrolet was leading with 90 points, sixteen points ahead of Toyota. Ford, with 67 points, was twelve points ahead of Dodge in the battle for third.

Practice and qualifying

Two practice sessions were also held before the race on June 8, 2012. The first session was 85 minutes long, while the second was 90 minutes. Martin was quickest with a time of 50.173 seconds in the first session, 0.124 faster than Jamie McMurray. Earnhardt Jr. was third quickest, followed by Johnson, Allmendinger, and Ryan Newman. Kahne was seventh, still within half of a second of Martin's time.  In the second and final practice, Joey Logano was quickest with a time of 50.139 seconds. Carl Edwards followed in second, ahead of Gordon and Paul Menard. Kyle Busch was fifth quickest, with a time of 50.409 seconds. Kahne, Biffle, Brad Keselowski, Allmendinger, and Marcos Ambrose rounded out the first ten positions. McMurray, who was second quickest in the first session, could only manage 34th. Also in the first practice session, Stephen Leicht struck a groundhog with his car, after Truex Jr. brushed the SAFER barrier attempting to avoid it.

Forty-four cars were entered for qualifying on June 9, 2012, but only forty-three could qualify for the race because of NASCAR's qualifying procedure.  After having problems with oil-dry in turn one, Logano of Joe Gibbs Racing clinched the fourth pole position of his Sprint Cup Series career, with a time of 50.112 seconds, which beat the old track record. He was joined on the front row of the grid by Edwards. Menard qualified third, Kyle Busch took fourth, and Hamlin started fifth. Martin, Regan Smith, Earnhardt Jr., Ambrose and Kahne rounded out the top ten. The driver that failed to qualify for the race was David Stremme.

Once the qualifying session was completed, Logano stated, "The track was dirty. When I went out there and got to that trouble spot, I got loose a little bit and didn't get to the bottom as well as I wanted to. So I felt like I left a tenth and a half [of a second] or so right there, but I felt like I nailed [Turns] 2 and 3 pretty well. I was hoping it would be in the top five, and it ended up being good enough."

Race
The race, the fourteenth in the season, began at 1:20 p.m. EDT and was televised live in the United States on TNT. Mike Kloton, Archdiocese of Scranton, Pennsylvania began pre-race ceremonies, by giving the invocation. Next, Naomi Scott performed the national anthem, and Dr. Rose Mattioli, chairman of Pocono Raceway, gave the command for drivers to start their engines.

At the start of the race, Logano maintained his pole position lead as Hamlin collided into Edwards going into the first turn, causing Edwards' car to rub against the tire. Also on the first lap, the first caution was given after Landon Cassill spun sideways and collided into Truex Jr. in the third turn. Allmendinger was also involved in the accident. During the caution, Edwards pitted to repair damages to his car, as Cassill drove to the garage. On the sixth lap, Logano led Menard on the restart. Two laps later, the three drivers involved in the first caution were forced to pit after being penalized by NASCAR. By the twelfth lap, Logano had extended his lead to two seconds over second placed Menard. Two laps later, J. J. Yeley, Tony Raines and Reed Sorenson crashed into the wall, prompting the second caution. During the caution most of the front-runners pitted while Hamlin stayed on-track. Also under the caution, Montoya drove to the garage after having damage to the right side of his car, as Bowyer received a pit road speeding penalty.

At the lap 20 restart, McMurray led Keselowski, Hamlin, and Logano into the first turn. On the following lap, Leicht made a pit stop, as Hamlin took the first position. Hamlin, who had won four previous times at Pocono Raceway, continued to extend his lead to 1.1 seconds by the 25th lap. Six laps later on lap 31, Joe Nemechek pitted, only two laps before Hamlin and Keselowski, and three before McMurray. On the 34th lap, Keselowski received a pit road speeding penalty, as Earnhardt Jr. became the leader. Four laps later, Casey Mears drove to the garage, while Michael McDowell pitted. At lap 42, Gordon and Ambrose started the second set of green flag pit stops. On the following lap, Johnson pitted, as Gordon had to return to pit road after receiving a pit road speeding penalty. On the 44th lap, Kyle Busch, Logano and Ambrose pitted, as Johnson received a pit road speeding penalty. Johnson received a second penalty for speeding on pit road on the next lap. Kyle Busch, Harvick, David Reutimann and Newman were also given a pit road speeding penalty. Following pit stops, Hamlin was the leader ahead of Earnhardt Jr.

On the 58th lap, Kenseth passed McMurray for the third position, as Johnson remained a lap behind the leaders after three penalties. Two laps later, Earnhardt Jr. reclaimed the lead from Hamlin. At lap 64, McMurray pitted, as Hamlin told his team he ran out of fuel. The third caution was given two laps later after Allmendinger crashed in the second turn from having no brakes. Most of the leaders pitted during the caution as McMurray, who pitted a few laps earlier, stayed on the track. Also during the caution, Jeff Burton became the 17th driver to be penalized for speeding on pit road, as Johnson chose the wave-around to return to the lead lap. At the lap 72 restart, McMurray was the leader ahead of Kahne. Two laps later, the fourth caution was given after debris was located on the track. McMurray, Hamlin, Kahne and Johnson pitted during the caution, as Kyle Busch drove to the garage. On the 83rd lap, the race resumed with Biffle the leader ahead of Martin, Earnhardt Jr., Logano and Kenseth.

Nine laps later, Kenseth and Earnhardt Jr. passed Biffle to claim the first two positions. On the 98th lap, Kyle Busch retired from the race after having engine problems. On the following lap, Edwards began another set of green flag pit stops. On the 101st lap, Ambrose, Newman, Johnson and three others pitted, just one lap before Kenseth, Earnhardt, and Biffle. After every team pitted, Earnhardt Jr. reclaimed the first position, as Biffle reported engine problems to his team. By lap 118, Newman and Johnson were placed sixth and seventh. Five laps later, the fifth caution was given after debris from Aric Almirola collision with the wall was located on the track. During the caution most of the front-runners pitted. At the lap 129 restart, Logano led Martin into the first turn. During the next three laps, Keselowski, Dave Blaney, Reutimann and Harvick pitted.

At lap 138, Kahne collided into the turn 2 wall, prompting the sixth caution. Only some of the drivers chose to pit during the caution, leaving Logano and Martin in the first two positions for the restart on lap 143. Six laps later, the seventh caution was given after debris was located. Logano and Martin continued to be in the first two positions at the lap 152 restart. During the same lap, Martin claimed the first position from Logano, as Stewart, Hamlin and Johnson rounded out the first five positions. With four laps remaining, Logano reclaimed the lead from Martin with a bump-and-run. Logano maintained the first position to claim his second Sprint Cup Series career win. Martin took the second position ahead of Stewart and Johnson. Hamlin finished in the fifth position, as Bowyer, Kenseth, Earnhardt Jr., Menard and McMurray completed the first ten positions.

Results

Qualifying

Race results

Standings after the race

Drivers' Championship standings

Manufacturers' Championship standings

Note: Only the top five positions are included for the driver standings.

References

NASCAR races at Pocono Raceway
Pocono 400
Pocono 400
Pocono 400